Leo the Lion may refer to:

 Leo the Lion (MGM), the mascot of the Hollywood film studio Metro-Goldwyn-Mayer
 Leo the Lion (TV series), a Japanese animated series by Osamu Tezuka
 Leo the Lion (2005 film), a 2005 Italian animated film 
 Leo the Lion (singer), British singer Leo Ihenacho (born 1977)
 Leo the Lion, the Mascot of Real Salt Lake Soccer Team
 Leo "The Lion" Nomellini (1924–2000), American football player